San Benito High School may refer to:
 San Benito High School (California), in Hollister, California
 San Benito High School (Texas), in San Benito, Texas